Leila Pahlavi (27 March 1970 – 10 June 2001) was a princess of Iran and the youngest daughter of Mohammad Reza Pahlavi, Shah of Iran, and his third wife, Farah Pahlavi.

Early life
Leila Pahlavi was born on 27 March 1970 in Tehran, Iran. She was the fourth and youngest child of the Shah Mohammad Reza Pahlavi and the Empress Farah Pahlavi. She had two elder brothers, an elder sister and an elder half-sister.

In exile
Leila Pahlavi was nine years old when her family was forced into exile as a result of the Iranian Revolution in 1979. Following her father's death in Egypt from non-Hodgkin's lymphoma in 1980, the family settled in the United States. She attended the United Nations International School in New York City and graduated from Rye Country Day School in 1988. She spoke Farsi, English, and French fluently, as well as some Spanish and Italian. She spent much of her time commuting between her home in Greenwich, Connecticut, and Paris, where her mother was living.

Pahlavi studied at Brown University literature and philosophy, she was said to have graduated in 1992. However some sources say she left university before graduation due to her declining health. She was a onetime model for the designer Valentino, and suffered from anorexia nervosa, chronic low self-esteem, severe depression and chronic fatigue syndrome.

Death

On Sunday 10 June 2001, Leila was found dead in her room in Leonard Hotel in London just before 19:30 BST by her doctor. She was found to have more than five times the lethal dose of Seconal, a barbiturate, which is used to treat insomnia, in her system, along with a nonlethal amount of cocaine. She was found in bed, her body emaciated by years of anorexia, bulimia, and food intolerances.  According to a report on her death, which included information from an autopsy conducted by the Westminster Coroner's Court, she stole the Seconal from her doctor's desk during an appointment and was addicted to the drug, typically taking 40 pills at once, rather than the prescribed two.

On 17 June 2001, she was buried near her maternal grandmother, Farideh Diba (née Ghotbi), in the Cimetière de Passy, Paris, France. At the funeral attendance was her mother, Empress Farah; the imperial family of Iran; as well as members of the former French royal family; and Frederic Mitterrand, the nephew of the late French President François Mitterrand.

On 4 January 2011, her brother Ali Reza Pahlavi was found dead at his home in Boston, Massachusetts, from an apparent suicide.

Ancestry

References

External links

Leila's Memorial site by her mother
Iranian.com editorial about Pahlavi's death
Guardian article about results of Pahlavi death inquest

1970 births
2001 deaths
Pahlavi princesses
Rye Country Day School alumni
Brown University alumni
Mohammad Reza Pahlavi
Exiles of the Iranian Revolution in the Bahamas
Exiles of the Iranian Revolution in Egypt
Exiles of the Iranian Revolution in Panama
Exiles of the Iranian Revolution in Mexico
Exiles of the Iranian Revolution in Morocco
Exiles of the Iranian Revolution in the United States
People with chronic fatigue syndrome
Barbiturates-related deaths
Burials at Passy Cemetery
Drug-related deaths in England
Iranian female models